Universal Flowering (Mirovoi rastsvet) is the name given by Pavel Filonov to his system of analytical art.  The system arose from cubo-futurist experiments and works that he undertook from 1913 to 1915.  It is characterized by very dense, minutely facetted, and relatively flat surfaces created by working from the particular to the general, using the smallest of brushes and the sharpest of pencils.  The images have both Cubism's multiple vantage points and Futurism's representation of a figure over time. A number of the paintings, while having a given orientation, are painted as though they could be oriented in a variety of ways.  Filonov's philosophy was originally formalized in written form in 1915, which was revised and published as The Declaration of Universal Flowering in 1923 when Filonov was a professor at the (then) Petrograd Academy of Arts.  Filonov's main theoretical work The Ideology of Analytical Art (Ideologia analiticheskogo iskusstva) was published in 1930.

Russian art
Soviet art
Modern art
Analytical art